The Jennings Carnegie Public Library is a Carnegie library located at 303 North Cary Avenue in Jennings, Louisiana.

Built in 1908 with buff brick with white woodwork trim, and is located on a corner lot on the edge of the business district of Jennings.  The main entrance is into a domed octagonal rotunda at the corner of the V-shaped building, with four Corinthian columns topped by a full entablature and a parapet beneath the dome.  It is Palladian or Italian Renaissance architecture, designed by New York City architects Whitfield & King.

It was remodeled in 1952 and the south wing of the building was extended by four bays, with compatible brickwork and details.

It is operated by the City of Jennings.

The library was listed on the National Register of Historic Places on January 8, 1982.

See also
 National Register of Historic Places listings in Jefferson Davis Parish, Louisiana

References

Library buildings completed in 1908
Libraries on the National Register of Historic Places in Louisiana
Public libraries in Louisiana
Carnegie libraries in Louisiana
Buildings and structures in Jefferson Davis Parish, Louisiana
Education in Jefferson Davis Parish, Louisiana
National Register of Historic Places in Jefferson Davis Parish, Louisiana
1908 establishments in Louisiana